is a Japanese composer and arranger from Hamamatsu, Shizuoka. Yamashita is best known for his work on Digimon Xros Wars, Xenosaga: The Animation, and the tokusatsu television series Mahou Sentai Magiranger, Kaizoku Sentai Gokaiger, and Kamen Rider Gaim. He is a member of Project.R.

Yamashita often collaborates with Nobuhiko Obayashi, as Yamashita met him soon after Yamashita graduated from the Tokyo College of Music.

He is a board member of the Japanese Composer Arranger Association. Since April 2011, Yamashita has been a guest lecturer at the Senzoku Gakuen College of Music. In 2013, released the album A Classical in collaboration with J-pop singer Ayumi Hamasaki. It was the first classical music album to top the Oricon album chart.

Works

References

External links
 Office Two One Official Profile Archived Archived (Japanese)
 Japanese Arrangers and Composers Association profile (Japanese)
 
 Kosuke Yamashita at Video Game Music Database
 
 Oricon profile and rankings for the Kurosagi OST by Kosuke Yamashita

1974 births
Anime composers
Japanese composers
Japanese film score composers
Japanese male composers
Japanese male film score composers
Japanese music arrangers
Living people
Musicians from Shizuoka Prefecture